Anushavan Rafaelovich Gassan-Dzhalalov (born 23 April 1947) is a Russian rower who competed for the Soviet Union in the 1976 Summer Olympics.

In 1976 he was a crew member of the Soviet boat which won the bronze medal in the coxless four event.

References 

 
 His Website about Rowing

External links
 

1947 births
Sportspeople from Gyumri
Living people
Russian male rowers
Soviet male rowers
Olympic rowers of the Soviet Union
Rowers at the 1976 Summer Olympics
Olympic bronze medalists for the Soviet Union
Olympic medalists in rowing
Russian people of Armenian descent
World Rowing Championships medalists for the Soviet Union
Medalists at the 1976 Summer Olympics
European Rowing Championships medalists